Frommia is a genus of flowering plants belonging to the family Apiaceae. It has only one species, Frommia ceratophylloides. Its native range is Southern Tanzania to Northeastern Zambia.

References

Apioideae
Monotypic Apioideae genera